The Arboretum du Chemin de la Découverte is an arboretum located in Melle, Deux-Sèvres, Nouvelle-Aquitaine, France. It is open daily without charge.

The arboretum was established in 1987 along a disused railway track (6 km), and now contains more than 1,000 species of woody plants, with good collections of ash, birch, chestnut, hackberry, hornbeam, lime trees, and willows, as well as more than 250 rose varieties.

See also 
 List of botanical gardens in France

References 
 Arboretum du Chemin de la Découverte
 Jardinez entry (French)
 Gralon.net entry (French)
 Bellebouche description
 Lagroie description

Gardens in Deux-Sèvres
Chemin de la découverte